Live like Ali, die like Hussein is a religious slogan used by Shia Muslims, referring to the martyrs Ali and his son Husayn ibn Ali.

Other famous Shia slogans
There is no hero (some versions replace hero with man) except Ali; there is no sword except Zulfiqar - This slogan is very famous among Shia; reported to have originated from Muhammad and is widely engraved on weapons, such as swords. The slogan is frequently preceded by a Shia invocation to Ali and is also “central to the du’a (prayer) of Isma’ilis, who recite it in one breath together with their declaration of faith in God.”
Every place is Karbala; every day is Ashura - This slogan is often repeated by some Shia.

References

Shia Islam
Slogans